San Lorenzo in Nifili is a Romanesque-style, Roman Catholic church located in the town of Farnetta, part of the commune of Montecastrilli, in the province of Terni, region of Umbria, Italy.

History
A church is documented since 1112, when it was donated by the Count Rapizzo degli Arnolfi to the Abbey of Farfa. The church incorporates spolia from an ancient Roman construction. In 1777, it became part of the parish of Farnetta.

References

Montecastrilli
Montecastrilli
Montecastrilli